Baredine Cave is a geomorphologic monument of nature and the first speleologic locality and tourist cave in Istria opened for visits since 1995.

It is situated in western part of Istria 6 km north-east from Poreč, Croatia.

Sightseeing 
The sightseeing lasts 40 minutes, visitors descend along a 300m long pathway up to 60m below the ground and an underground lake and visit 5 beautifully decorated chambers.
An interesting detail of this adventurous trip is also the encounter with the underground world of animals: visitors will see the cave olm (Proteus anguinus Laurenti), endemic in this dinaric karst region- an animal that can be found only in this karst area.
In one of the chambers you will pass along a 4m wide passage that leads 66m vertically down reaching the deepest point of the cave at 132m.

The cave is well-lit and ordered, the pathway and the stairs have firm rails. The temperature is very pleasant 14°C.

Guided tours start every 30 minutes with a guide (included in price) in the following languages: Croatian, Italian, German, English, Russian (with prior announcement Slovenian and French are available).

Terrain description 
The Baredine cave got its name from the expression for the nearby terrain (baredine), which probably comes from the word bared, used in the local dialect to denote untreated land. The Baredine Cave is situated in the western part of Istria between Višnjan and Poreč, only 5km away from the coast. The karst region, where it was created, is a sea sediment covered by red soil (terra rossa). From the vertical entrance into the cave situated at 117m above the sea level there views over olive and grape vine plantations all the way to the sea.

History

First explorations 

The cave has been known and visited since times immemorial.

The first documented explorations were conducted by speleologists from Trieste at the beginning of the 20th century when those explorers went as far as 80 m into its depth.

Explorations of SD Proteus 

It was in the year 1973 that the members of Poreč's Caving Club Proteus  went to the lower part of the cave where they discovered  a passage which made it possible for them  to go as far as the underground lakes, i. e. to what is today considered to be the total depth of the cave. It was at their initiative that,  in 1986,  the Baredine Cave was, owing to its very special characteristics and exquisite beauty, proclaimed a monument of nature.

Newer explorations and valorization 

The first concrete efforts to adapt the cave started at the beginning of the 90's. In May 1995 the cave was opened for tourist visits. In the following years the infrastructure was improved, which created conditions for a pleasant stay in and around the cave.
Since the first proper explorations in the Baredine cave in 1973 until today there have been additional explorations with the aim of finding new, unexplored spaces. Surface pottery has been collected in soil sediments bearing witness to the fact that human beings entered the cave in ancient times and used to live there. Subterranean fauna has also been explored and studied.

Sources
Baredine, jama kraj Poreča at istrapedia.hr

External links

Caves of Croatia
Limestone caves
Landforms of Istria County
Karst formations of Croatia
Show caves in Croatia